Kickapoo Creek is a stream in Schleicher, Tom Green and Concho counties in west central Texas. It is a tributary of the Concho River.

See also
List of rivers of Texas

References

USGS Hydrologic Unit Map - State of Texas (1974)

Rivers of Texas
Rivers of Tom Green County, Texas
Rivers of Concho County, Texas
Rivers of Schleicher County, Texas